The Reserve Infantry Division of Xinjiang Military District() is a reserve infantry formation of the People's Liberation Army.

The division was activated in March 1999.
		
Since then the division was composed of:
1st Regiment - Suihua, Heilongjiang
2nd Regiment - Heihe, Heilongjiang
3rd Regiment - Mudanjiang, Heilongjiang
Artillery Regiment - Mudanjiang, Heilongjiang
Anti-Aircraft Artillery Regiment  - Jiamusi, Heilongjiang
Engineer Regiment - Harbin, Heilongjiang.

References

Reserve divisions of the People's Liberation Army
Military units and formations established in 1999